Paraná Province was one of the provinces of the Empire of Brazil.

In 1853, Paraná Province was split from São Paulo Province. In 1889, it became Paraná State.

Provinces of Brazil